Atilax is a genus of mongoose containing a single living species, the marsh mongoose (Atilax paludinosus). A single fossil species probably ancestral to the marsh mongoose is also known from South Africa.

The generic name Atilax was introduced in 1826 by Frédéric Cuvier.

They are solitary, nocturnal, and semi-aquatic mammals that inhabits wetlands and feeds on fish, crustaceans, frogs, and small mammals.

References

Mammal genera
Mammal genera with one living species
Taxa named by Frédéric Cuvier
Mongooses